is a Prefectural Natural Park on the west coast of Kumamoto Prefecture, Japan. Established in 1956, the park spans the municipalities of Kami-Amakusa, Uki, and Uto.

See also
 National Parks of Japan
 Unzen-Amakusa National Park

References

External links
  Map of Natural Parks of Kumamoto Prefecture

Parks and gardens in Kumamoto Prefecture
Protected areas established in 1956
1956 establishments in Japan